Fernando de las Fuentes Hernández (born August 7, 1960) is a Mexican lawyer, entrepreneur and politician, affiliated with the Institutional Revolutionary Party (PRI)

Personal life and education
De las Fuentes was born to José de las Fuentes Rodríguez and Elsa Hernández.  He studied law in the Universidad Autónoma de Coahuila. He is married to Patricia Arizpe with whom he has three children; Maria Fernanda, Raul Alberto and Jorge Arturo.

Political career
He began his career in Public Administration as Secretary of the Joint Agricultural Committee of the State of Mexico (1988 to 1990). In December 1993 he was appointed Director General of the State Tourism Development, to in 1997 to be in charge of the Directorate of Public Relations Executive.

By choice of the citizens of the Local II District of Saltillo joined the LV state Legislature to Congress, were coordinated by the Citizens Commission on Social and Management, and was part of four more committees (1999–2002).

He was elected federal deputy to the LIX Legislature of the Mexican Congress for the seventh electoral district, in the Saltillo area, and which belonged to the Commission to Strengthen Federalism and the Secretary of the Housing Commission (2003–2005).

Mayor of Saltillo, capital of Coahuila State (2006–2008). In this period the city received an unprecedented transformation in roadways, bridges, vehicle support and a sense of social development in countryside and urban areas coupled with an unprotected beautification of our urban environment.

In 1988, by the people of the I Electoral District got the highest vote achieved by a Local deputy of Saltillo, also serves as Coordinator of the PRI fraction and chairman of the board of Governors of Congress of the State of Coahuila LVIII Legislature.

In 2012, he was elected as federal deputy to the LXII Legislature of the Mexican Congress from the fourth electoral district, which was located in Saltillo.

External links
https://web.archive.org/web/20101029012505/http://www.congresocoahuila.gob.mx/modulos/transparencia/articulo21/curriculum.htm
http://www.milenio.com/node/155882
https://web.archive.org/web/20091027002743/http://mx.geocities.com/arma_dc/server/saltillo/alcaldes.htm
http://www.tuscandidatos.com/tus-candidatos/fernando-de-las-fuentes-hernandez
https://web.archive.org/web/20031214063627/http://www.cddhcu.gob.mx/curriculum/doctos/112.pdf
http://sil.gobernacion.gob.mx/Librerias/pp_PerfilLegislador.php?SID=&Referencia=569319
https://web.archive.org/web/20090813052155/http://www.diputados-pri.org.mx/Directorio.asp?Id_Diputado=94
http://www.poderjudicialcoahuila.gob.mx/tsj/pdf/MEMORIA_VI.pdf

See also 
 2005 Coahuila state election
 List of presidents of Saltillo Municipality

1960 births
Living people
Politicians from Saltillo
Institutional Revolutionary Party politicians
20th-century Mexican lawyers
Members of the Chamber of Deputies (Mexico) for Coahuila
Deputies of the LXIV Legislature of Mexico
Deputies of the LXII Legislature of Mexico
Deputies of the LIX Legislature of Mexico
Municipal presidents in Coahuila
Members of the Congress of Coahuila
21st-century Mexican politicians
Autonomous University of Coahuila alumni
Academic staff of the Autonomous University of Coahuila